is a railway station located in the city of Ishinomaki, Miyagi Prefecture, Japan, operated by East Japan Railway Company (JR East).

Lines
Kanomata Station is served by the Ishinomaki Line, and is located 21.2 kilometers from the terminus of the line at Kogota Station.

Station layout
The station has two opposed side platforms, connected to the station building by a footbridge. The station is unattended.

Platforms

History
Kanomata Station opened on October 28, 1912. The station was absorbed into the JR East network upon the privatization of Japanese National Railways (JNR) on April 1, 1987. Operations of the line and the station were suspended by the 2011 Tōhoku earthquake and tsunami of March 11, 2011. Services were resumed on March 17, 2013.

Surrounding area

Miyagi Prefectural Kannan High School
Kanomata Post Office

See also
 List of railway stations in Japan

External links

 

Railway stations in Miyagi Prefecture
Ishinomaki Line
Railway stations in Japan opened in 1912
Ishinomaki
Stations of East Japan Railway Company